Carl Busacker (April 3, 1854 – 1943) was a member of the Wisconsin State Assembly.

Biography
Busacker was born on April 3, 1854 in Pomerania, then in Prussia. He would go on to serve in the Imperial German Army. He died in 1943.

Assembly career
Busacker was elected to the Assembly in 1908. He was a Republican.

References

People from Pomerania
Politicians from Milwaukee
Republican Party members of the Wisconsin State Assembly
Military personnel of the German Empire
1854 births
1943 deaths
German emigrants to the United States